Estado Aragonés ('Aragonese State' in English) was a small Aragonese left-wing political party, and the first in the Region regarded as fully nationalist. It was founded in Barcelona in the winter of 1933, during the Second Spanish Republic. Many of their members came from Unión Aragonesista and were primarily emigrant Aragonese workers from the north-east county of Ribagorza. The president was Gaspar Torrente.

The youth wing of the party, Los Almogávares ('The Almogavars'), headed by Luis Porté, supported the declaration of the Catalan Republic by Lluis Companys in 1934, which lead to their headquarters being closed down. The organization was relatively inactive until 1936, when they opened a new head office and Miguel Alcubierre was elected as the president of the youth wing. He started a campaign for self-government in Aragon which aroused the interest of other left-wing Republican parties.

Those actions led to a Congress taking place in Caspe (Saragossa) at the beginning of May in 1936, with Torrente as the chairman. The result was the draft of a Statute of Autonomy for Aragon, which due to the onset of the Spanish Civil War would not come to light. By 1939 the party had ceased to exist.

Renacimiento Aragonés ('Aragonese Revival') was the party's official publication. The party was in good relations with the Catalan party Esquerra Republicana de Catalunya.

Estau Aragonés
In 2006, in a resurgence of Aragonese nationalist sentiment, Estau Aragonés (Estado Aragonés in Spanish, Estat Aragonès in Catalan) was founded as a new political party, inspired by the one of 1933.  It aims for the independence of Aragon and the liberation of the Aragonese working class. The youth wing organization of the party, created in 2007, is known as 'Astral-Mozardalla d'Estau Aragonés'.

In 2007, both Estau Aragonés and Astral, along with other Aragonese pro-independence organizations (Chobenalla, Puyalón, A Enrestida and the Aragonese Workers' Union, STA) formed a political bloc, called Bloque Independentista de Cuchas,  (Aragonese for 'Leftist Independent Block').

External links
 Article on Estado Aragonés in the Gran Enciclopedia Aragonesa 
 Estau Aragonés

Defunct communist parties in Spain
Political parties in Aragon
Pro-independence parties